Fort Putnam was a military garrison during the Revolutionary War at West Point, New York, United States.  Built by a regiment of Colonel Rufus Putnam's 5th Massachusetts Regiment, it was completed in 1778 with the purpose of supporting Fort Clinton, which sat on the edge of the Hudson River about 3/4 of a mile away. The fort was rebuilt and enlarged in 1794 before falling into disuse and disrepair as the military garrison at West Point became obsolete in the early mid-19th century.  It underwent a major preservation as a historical site in 1909, and has been continually in the process of preservation since. Sitting at an altitude of 500 feet above sea level, it was West Point's largest garrison during the Revolutionary War. The Fort is under the supervision of the West Point Museum Director, David M. Reel, and is operated by the United States Army Garrison, West Point. Access to the Fort is seasonal and as summer staff are available.

Construction
In 1778, Gen. Alexander McDougall wrote, "Genl. Parson, Clinton and Col. Delaradiere went with me to View the Rock & Crown Hills in the rear of our works..."(Fort Clinton).  Tadeusz Kościuszko convinced them of the necessity of defending Crown Hill, and drafted blueprints accordingly.  Gen. Israel Putnam's younger cousin, Col. Rufus Putnam, and three hundred men arrived on four sloops with lumber to build Fort Putnam.  McDougall wrote, "The hill which Col. Putnam is fortifying is the most commanding and important of any that we can now attend to...the easternmost face of this work must be so constructed as to command the plain."

See also
Redoubt Four (West Point)
Kosciuszko's Garden

References

United States Military Academy
1778 establishments in New York (state)
Military installations established in 1778